On My Own is an album released by a Polish pop singer Tatiana Okupnik.

Track listing 
 Introducing
 Tell Me Do I Drive U Crazy (Striptease)
 Don't Hold Back (Find Your Way)
 Shake It
 Hey Big Spender
 Around The World
 Tell Me What U Really Want
 Keep It On The Low
 Afterglow
 The Look (Of Love)
 Lovin' You (cover of Minnie Riperton's "Lovin' You")
 The Woman In Me
 On My Own

2007 albums